Hong Jung-eun (born 1974)  and Hong Mi-ran (born 1977), collectively known as the Hong sisters, are South Korean television screenwriters currently managed by Studio Dragon. Together, they have written popular romantic-comedies, notably My Girl (2005), You're Beautiful (2009), My Girlfriend Is a Nine-Tailed Fox (2010), The Greatest Love (2011), Master's Sun (2013), A Korean Odyssey (2017–2018), Hotel del Luna (2019), Alchemy of Souls (2022) and its second part Alchemy of Souls: Light and Shadow (2022–2023).

Career

Works
Sisters Hong Jung-eun and Hong Mi-ran were originally writers on a variety show. They made their TV drama writing debut in 2005 with Sassy Girl Chun-hyang, a modern retelling of the famous Korean folktale Chunhyangjeon in which Chun-hyang is no passive heroine, but a headstrong sassy girl. It became a huge hit not only in Korea, but throughout Asia. Their follow-up My Girl (2005), about a cheeky con artist who pretends to be the long-lost granddaughter of a rich man, was equally successful. The two dramas effectively made its young actors -- Han Chae-young and Jae Hee, and Lee Da-hae, Lee Joon-gi, and Lee Dong-wook -- into household names and Korean Wave stars.

The Hongs' winning streak continued with Couple or Trouble (also known as Fantasy Couple, 2006), a remake of the 1987 Hollywood film Overboard. It starred Han Ye-seul as a snooty heiress with amnesia who falls for a handyman played by Oh Ji-ho. 

For Hong Gil-dong (2008), the Hongs based their protagonist on the fictional folk hero Hong Gil-dong, a Joseon-era Robin Hood who stole from the rich and gave to the poor. But the fusion period comedy-drama starring Kang Ji-hwan and Sung Yu-ri combined royal plotting and romance with over-the-top stunts, gaudy costumes, toilet humor and anachronistic modern music. The series was popular online, but received average ratings. It also won Best Miniseries at the 2008 Roma Fiction Fest. 

You're Beautiful (2009) starred Jang Keun-suk and Park Shin-hye, in which a naive nun cross-dresses as a male idol singer in a boy band. Unlike the Hongs' early work, the drama did not get high ratings, but it did create a cult following (or "mania" fan base) online and among international viewers. Such was its pan-Asian popularity that remakes were produced in Japan (Ikemen desu ne, 2011) and Taiwan (Fabulous Boys, 2013). 

The Hongs played with Korean mythology for their next hit drama in 2010. In My Girlfriend Is a Nine-Tailed Fox, the gumiho (or nine-tailed fox) isn't the terrifying femme fatale of legend who feeds on human livers. Instead, she's a cute and clueless girl (played by Shin Min-ah) who loves to eat beef, while an aspiring stuntman (Lee Seung-gi) accompanies her in her quest to become human. 

Their next drama, 2011's The Greatest Love was again set amidst the gossipy and image-conscious world of entertainment, starring Cha Seung-won as the most beloved star in the nation who falls for a has-been pop singer (Gong Hyo-jin). The drama topped its timeslot during its run, and not only did it sweep the 2011 MBC Drama Awards (including the Writer of the Year award for the Hong sisters), Gong also won Best Actress at the 2012 Baeksang Arts Awards. 

Big (2012), in which an 18-year-old and a 30-year-old swap bodies, starred Gong Yoo and Lee Min-jung. The drama is arguably the Hongs' least successful work thus far, lacking both in ratings and buzz.

The Hongs reunited with Gong Hyo-jin in Master's Sun (2013), a horror romantic comedy with So Ji-sub about a woman who sees ghosts. 

In 2015, they cast Yoo Yeon-seok and Kang So-ra in Warm and Cozy, set in a restaurant on Jeju Island. The title is the English translation of the Jeju dialect phrase "Mendorong Ttottot."

Reinventing acting careers

The Hong sisters are credited with reinventing the careers of several of their leading ladies. Han Chae-young was a sexy "Barbie doll" known for her figure more than her acting when her role in Sassy Girl Chun-hyang turned her sultry image on its head and transformed her into a plucky, optimistic, hard-working model student. Lee Da-hae had a somewhat melancholy image from Heaven's Fate, and surprised viewers with her versatility by going cute in My Girl. Han Ye-seul and Sung Yu-ri were dogged early in their careers by criticisms for their poor acting, until Han's privileged, rude character won viewers over with her notable catchphrases in Couple or Trouble, and the Hongs were so impressed with Sung in Hong Gil-dong that they posted up strong praise and defense of her acting on the drama's website. Shin Min-ah had become better known in recent years for being a stylish advertisement model rather than an actress, but My Girlfriend Is a Nine-Tailed Fox gave her her most memorable character yet. Similarly, with his role of Dokko Jin, Cha Seung-won returned to his comedic roots after years of serious roles, resulting in massive media attention.

Critical assessment
The Hong sisters have become known for mixing broad, somewhat juvenile comedy with elements of romance, then transitioning to heartbreak in the drama's second half. They've created a trademark style with their fast, fun narratives, hilarious situations, love of puns and meta references, and memorable and quirky characters, and their name has become a recognizable brand in the Korean drama industry.

Filmography

Awards
2011 MBC Drama Awards: Writer of the Year (The Greatest Love)

Notes

References

External links

Living people
South Korean screenwriters
South Korean television writers
Sister duos
Women television writers
1974 births
1977 births